Gemert-Bakel is a municipality in the southern Netherlands.

Geography

Population centres

Topography

Dutch Topographic map of the municipality of Gemert-Bakel, June 2015

Climate
Climate in this area has mild differences between highs and lows, and there is adequate rainfall year-round.  The Köppen Climate Classification subtype for this climate is "Cfb". (Marine West Coast Climate/Oceanic climate).

Castle
In the centre of Gemert stands a castle of which the oldest parts date back to the Late Middle Ages, although it has been rebuilt a couple of times. It was founded by German knights who lived in the castle for several hundred years, however these days it is occupied by monks and nuns. The predecessor of this castle was a motte-and-bailey located further to the west and was discovered in 1995. It is said that the townfounder Diederik van Gemert lived here.

Notable people 

 Georgius Macropedius (1487 in Gemert – 1558) a Dutch humanist and schoolmaster
 Lawrence Torrentinus (1499 in Gemert – 1563) a Dutch-Italian humanist, typographer and printer for Cosimo I de' Medici, Duke of  Florence
 Jan van Gemert (1921 in Gemert – 1991) a Dutch painter, graphic artist, sculptor, glass artist and ceramist
 Wim Verstappen (1937 in Gemert – 2004) a Dutch film director and producer, television director, and screen writer 
 Frans van der Hoff (born 1939 in De Rips) a Dutch missionary who helped launch Max Havelaar the first Fairtrade label in 1988
 Haico Scharn (1945–2021, born in Gemert) a Dutch middle-distance runner, competed at the 1972 Summer Olympics
 Victor Allis (born 1965 in Gemert) a Dutch computer scientist and academic
 Ben Gall (born 1948 in Eindhoven) a Dutch entrepreneur who founded several high tech companies in NL and the USA. Collects modern art and has been supporting the arts for decades. Now retired and living in San Miguel de Allende, Mexico

Trivia
The spoken language is Peellands (an East Brabantian dialect, which is very similar to colloquial Dutch).

Gallery

References

External links

Official website

 
Municipalities of North Brabant
Municipalities of the Netherlands established in 1997